Buh  is a village in Kapurthala district of Punjab State, India. The village is administrated by a Sarpanch, who is an elected representative.

Demography 
According to the report published by Census India in 2011, Buh has a total number of 281 houses and population of 1,526 of which include 784 males and 742 females. Literacy rate of Buh is  72.13%, lower than state average of 75.84%.  The population of children under the age of 6 years is 191 which is 12.52% of total population of Buh, and child sex ratio is approximately  736, lower than state average of 846.

Population data

Air travel connectivity 
The closest airport to the village is Sri Guru Ram Dass Jee International Airport.

Villages in Kapurthala

External links
  Villages in Kapurthala
 Kapurthala Villages List

References

Villages in Kapurthala district